Baluchi, Afghanistan or Balūchī, Afghanistan may refer to:
Balūchī, Farah
Balūchī, Helmand
Balūchī, Herat
Balūchī, Orūzgān
Balūchī, Sar-e Pol